The Titushky (plural;) were mercenary agents in Ukraine who supported the Ukrainian security services during the administration of Viktor Yanukovych, often posing as street hooligans in sports clothing with the purpose of serving as provocateurs at pro-European and anti-Yanukovych political rallies that would incite violence in order to get protestors arrested. Their role grew more prominent in the wake of Euromaidan, where they were involved in numerous clashes and acts of violence during the movement.

In the early 2010s, a “Titushky raid” (Russian: титушки рейд) was a widely-used slang term in both Ukrainian and the Russian spoken in Ukraine to describe street beatings, carjackings, and kidnappings by unidentified men in civilian clothes from behind the lines of political rallies. Titushky were employed by the Yanukovych government, reportedly receiving 200 hryvnia to $100 per day in payments. Some were also suspected of being illegal formations of combat troops carrying concealed pistols. They carried out intimidation and dispersal of anti-government demonstrations, and attacked participants and representative of the news media.

Titushky adopted the strategy of blending into a peaceful crowd or mob and then instigating a violent fight, which led to arrests of peaceful protesters on the grounds of mass disorder; the perpetrators were then used either as witnesses of the supposed crime, or as victims. During Euromaidan in 2013–2014, they became a collective term for agents provocateurs and thugs, who were hired by the Party of Regions and law enforcement agents in civilian clothing. Supporters of President Yanukovych also used the term titushky to refer to pro-opposition thugs.

Etymology 
The term Titushky derives from the surname of Vadym Titushko (Russian: Вадима Титушко), also known as Vadik “Rumyn” (Russian: Вадик «Румын»), meaning Vadik "the Romanian", a mixed martial artist from Bila Tserkva who attacked Channel Five journalists on May 18, 2013, during the Rise up, Ukraine! opposition rally. He and two other men received suspended sentences over the attack. Titushko said he was unhappy to have his name associated with thugs, and that he supported the anti-government Euromaidan protests. In his interview, Titushko asserted that he was hired to protect the opposition rally and that he tried to remove a woman from harm's way, from amid a melee.

Activity 
In January 2014, a former head of the Security Service of Ukraine, General Palivoda, stated "Titushki are actively used by the government in local standoffs with people. These are groups of provocateurs who get paid and these are mostly people without steady moral principles and very poor people who desperately need some money. They are not bandits nor prisoners nor criminals. Often they don't even know who gathered them and what they will have to do. They understand what they got involved in only after they find themselves in the middle of some action." However, Vyacheslav Veremiy, a Vesti Reporter journalist traveling to Euromaidan, was pulled out of his car by a Titushky squad and shot to death point-blank from a concealed gun, indicating more than just a happenstance action. Veremiy's killing was confirmed on Wednesday 19 February 2014 at 6.45 am.

According to What's On magazine, Titushky openly fired live ammunition on 18 February 2014, resulting in the death at least one protester at the scene near the Supreme Court building in Kyiv. On the same day, some 200 Titushky men, dressed as Maidan defence units with green helmets and shields, joined Berkut troops and beat protesters on Velyka Zhytomerska using bats and iron pipes. Titushky also blocked a polling station in Mykolaiv during the presidential election amidst pro-Russian unrest in Ukraine in the early stages of the Russo-Ukrainian War, on 25 May 2014. After 2014, accused of collaboration with Yanukovych, Titushky quickly disappeared from Ukraine, with many finding themselves arrested or fleeing to Russia.

Ititushky 
In 2013, the word ititushky or ititushkas (pronounced ajtitushky) (Russian: айтитушки) quickly appeared in the Myslovo dictionary of modern Ukrainian slang, and also soon became a widespread term in the Russian used in Ukraine. A portmanteau of the words IT and titushka, it refers to a hacker or an ordinary user who acted aggressively against pro-Euromaidan blogs and websites, using DDoS attacks, aggressive comments, or trolling.

Similar groups 
The murder of Stanisław Pyjas, a student at the time, is a well known case of illegal sprawcy activity.

Piotr Siuda (1937 - May 1990), a victim and volunteer of Novocherkassk Massacre who had investigated it in 1980s had reported that, at the time, Soviet Militia in his own city of Novocherkassk used semi-legal groups of ex-convicts to hunt down and beat up political activists and dissent.  Piotr himself was killed in 90s under suspicious circumstances.

See also 

 Paramilitary
 Plainclothes law enforcement — police officers, militia members, or soldiers disguised in civilian clothes
 Undercover operation
 Shabiha (in Syria)
 Colectivo (Venezuela)

References

External link 

Ukrainian words and phrases
Political slurs for people
Ukrainian culture
Society of Ukraine
Ukrainian slang
Paramilitary organizations based in Ukraine
Stereotypes
Social class subcultures
Criminal subcultures
Euromaidan
Anti-Maidan
2013 neologisms